Fremont Township is a township in Clarke County, Iowa, USA.  As of the 2000 census, its population was 507.

Geography
Fremont Township covers an area of 36.29 square miles (93.99 km) and contains no incorporated settlements.  According to the USGS, it contains four cemeteries: Fremont, Green, Jamison and Union Chapel.

The streams of South Squaw Creek and Walnut Creek run through this township.

References
 USGS Geographic Names Information System (GNIS)

External links
 US-Counties.com
 City-Data.com

Townships in Clarke County, Iowa
Townships in Iowa